Chiller Theatre was a Saturday night show on Channel 11 WPIX in New York City that showed classic horror movies.

History

1960s
Chiller Theater actually began on WPIX during 1961 (with the montage of clips discussed post 1965) and in 1963 included Zacherley ("The Cool Ghoul") as the on-air host. However, by 1965, Zacherley left the show, but the show maintained its "Classic Montage Opening" that used a montage of clips from various 1950s sci-fi films. This montage of clips started with the classic scene from Plan 9 from Outer Space with Vampira coming out of the woods. Then, the clip from The Cyclops, showing Actress Gloria Talbott just inside a cave looking at the Cyclops. Various other clips continued throughout the montage, concluding with the classic "goof" from Attack of the 50 Foot Woman, with the giant alien from outer space, picking up one brand of car and then shown throwing a completely different brand of car into a ditch. The entire montage was permeated by a frightening library music track ("Horror Upon Horror" by veteran British composer, Wilfred Josephs). Many "Baby Boomers" from this era growing up in the Tri-State Area, have said that this opening provided many nightmares and sleepless nights, forcing some to change the channel when this opening began.

The montage opening served until the late 1960s when another introduction was produced, featuring the word "Chiller" rendered in white paint on a black board, then lifted up, the gooey white paint slowly running down the board like blood while creepy chamber music played in the background. The bumper to this version simply showed the painted "Chiller" as a title card. It is unknown if this opening was the original, dating from the show's inception or if it was created out of necessity; it has been suggested that the montage opening was dropped in favor of this version since by the late 1960s film studios began to charge television stations royalties for film clips.

1970s
By 1971, the painted title card sequence was replaced with the popular Claymation "Six-Fingered Hand" introduction, produced by WPIX in-house, with possible assistance from a Rankin Bass technician (the same production company that produced the 1964 Claymation Rudolph The Red Nose Reindeer, although Rankin Bass did not produce the Chiller animated sequence). The "Six-Fingered Hand" sequence features a minimalistic/surreal scene of a swamp with a river of blood in the foreground extending back to the horizon, a dead tree in the background, and a six-fingered humanoid hand that rises from the swamp. The soundtrack consists of a reverberant whistling and ghostly sound elements that fall in pitch as the sequence progresses. As the hand rises, the word "Chiller" simultaneously emerges from the ground. The hand passes over each growing letter approvingly, then snatches them one by one before returning to the swamp, groaning "Chillllller ..." in an eerie, robotic voice.

The "Six-Fingered Hand" opening was used throughout the remainder of the show's run through the early 1980s. The program usually aired at 8:00 p.m. on Saturday nights, but for a time in 1974, it was aired at 11:30 p.m. It went off the air at the end of 1978 and returned in early 1980 at 2:00 a.m. Sunday late-night.

1980s and 2008, 2009, 2010, and 2011 revivals
Chiller Theatre was cancelled in 1982. The WPIX program showed very much the same classic horror and science fiction movies as the Pittsburgh station did.

After a 26-year absence on WPIX, Chiller Theatre returned on Saturday, October 25, 2008 at 8 p.m. for one night, with Tarantula as the movie of choice. The fans and new converts greatly anticipate a groundswell of support for more revivals of this show, if not a permanent place on WPIX's Saturday night roster. The show opened with the Classic Black and White Original Montage Opening, followed during commercial breaks by shots of the famous Six Finger Claymation Hand.

On August 13, 2009, WPIX officially announced a return of the annual Halloween special. It was revealed in October that Chiller Theatre would air the Hammer chestnut The Evil of Frankenstein with Elvira, Mistress of the Night as hostess, replacing Zacherley, the Cool Ghoul. The fan response was positive, and WPIX allowed Elvira more airtime to deliver her trademark one-liners with varying degrees of taste. Despite the criticism, the show appeared to do well enough against the World Series that night, and WPIX for the first time has begun marketing Chiller Theatre memorabilia at its website.

In 2010, WPIX Channel 11 announced that Chiller Theatre would return to the station on Halloween weekend with four frightening films: White Zombie, Bride of the Monster, Dolls and Child's Play.

In 2011, WPIX announced that they would air Chiller Theatre again on October 29, 2011.  The two movies featured for 2011 were the 1960 version of The Little Shop of Horrors followed by Night of the Living Dead.  2011's presentation was hosted by several personalities from WPIX's morning newscast. While the 2011 presentation did include very brief showings of the Six Figure Claymation Hand, there were no showings of the original opening. WPIX has not aired another Chiller Theatre Halloween special since.

Since 1990, New Jersey has been the host of the Chiller Theater Convention, which has become one of the largest horror conventions in the eastern United States.

Death of John Zacherle

Horror movie host John Zacherle, nicknamed "The Cool Ghoul," died on October 27, 2016 in Manhattan, New York City. He was 98. Zacherle was best known for presenting horror films on local TV stations in New York and Philadelphia throughout the 1950s and 1960s. Zacherle moved his act to New York City in 1959 and changed the name of his show to "Zacherley at Large" and the name of his character to Zacherley. He went on to join WPIX in New York and served as host for "Chiller Theatre" from 1963 to 1965.

References

External links
Chiller Theater Film Broadcast Dates 
Chiller Theater original opening recreation

American television series revived after cancellation
Culture of New York City
1961 American television series debuts
1978 American television series endings
1980 American television series debuts
1982 American television series endings
1960s American television series
1970s American television series
1980s American television series
2000s American television series
2010s American television series
Chiller Theatre